Alcathousites asperipennis is a species of longhorn beetles of the subfamily Lamiinae. It was described by Fairmaire and Germain in 1859, and is known from Chile and Peru.

References

Beetles described in 1859
Acanthocinini